Ron (Roni) Bolotin is an Israeli paralympic swimming champion.

Bolotin was born in Jerusalem. In his younger years he moved with his family to Beer Sheva and later to Tel Aviv, where he studied and began practicing competitive swimming. He was drafted to the IDF in 1975 and served in Sayeret Shaked. During a routine practice in the Sinai Peninsula, a landmine caused him to lose one of his legs. For several months Bolotin also lost his eyesight, which he later recovered.

In his rehabilitation, Bolotin returned to practice swimming and was a member of the national swimming team for the disabled. In 1976 he won the national championship and in 1979 the European championship, in which he also gained a world record for 100m butterfly. Between the years 1980 and 2000 he took part in six Paralympic Games and won 11 medals. He was made coach of the national paralympic swimming team in 1988. Since 1989 he is also the head of the division for sports in the national company for community centers.

Bolotin is a graduate of business administration from Tel Aviv University and holds a MA and PhD in physical education.

References

External links
 

Living people
Israeli male swimmers
Paralympic swimmers of Israel
Swimmers at the 1980 Summer Paralympics
Swimmers at the 1984 Summer Paralympics
Swimmers at the 1988 Summer Paralympics
Swimmers at the 1992 Summer Paralympics
Swimmers at the 1996 Summer Paralympics
Swimmers at the 2000 Summer Paralympics
Paralympic gold medalists for Israel
Paralympic silver medalists for Israel
Paralympic bronze medalists for Israel
Israeli amputees
Sportspeople from Jerusalem
Sportspeople from Tel Aviv
Medalists at the 1980 Summer Paralympics
Medalists at the 1984 Summer Paralympics
Medalists at the 1988 Summer Paralympics
Year of birth missing (living people)
Paralympic medalists in swimming